Iresine is a genus of flowering plants in the family Amaranthaceae. It contains 20 to 25 species, all of which are native to the American tropics. The generic name is derived from the Greek word εριος (erios), meaning "wooly", referring to the trichome-covered flowers. Bloodleaf is a common name for those species that have colored foliage, and these are often cultivated as ornamental plants. Some species are additives to versions of the hallucinogenic drink ayahuasca.

Species 
, Plants of the World Online accepted the following species:
Iresine ajuscana Suess. & Beyerle
Iresine alternifolia S.Watson
Iresine angustifolia Euphrasén – White snowplant
Iresine arbuscula Uline & W.L.Bray
Iresine arrecta Standl.
Iresine borschii Zumaya & Flores Olv.
Iresine cassiniiformis S.Schauer
Iresine chrysotricha (Suess.) Borsch, Flores Olv. & Kai Müll.
Iresine cubensis Borsch, Flores Olv. & Kai Müll.
Iresine diffusa Humb. & Bonpl. ex Willd. (= Iresine celosia, Iresine celosioides, Iresine canescens, Iresine paniculata (L.) Kuntze, Iresine elongata) – Juba's bush
Iresine discolor Greenm.
Iresine domingensis Urb.
Iresine flavescens Humb. & Bonpl. ex Willd. – Yellow bloodleaf
Iresine flavopilosa Suess.
Iresine hartmanii Uline
Iresine hebanthoides Suess.
Iresine herbstii Hook. ex Lindl. – Herbst's bloodleaf
Iresine heterophylla Standl. – Standley's bloodleaf
Iresine interrupta Benth.
Iresine jaliscana Uline & W.L.Bray
Iresine latifolia (M.Martens & Galeotti) Benth. & Hook.f.
Iresine laurifolia Suess.
Iresine leptoclada (Hook.f.) Henrickson & S.D.Sundb. – Texas shrub
Iresine nigra Uline & W.L.Bray
Iresine orientalis G.L.Nesom
Iresine palmeri (S.Watson) Standl. – Palmer's bloodleaf
Iresine pedicellata Eliasson (Ecuador)
Iresine pringlei S.Watson
Iresine rhizomatosa Standl. – Rootstock bloodleaf
Iresine rotundifolia Standl.
Iresine rzedowskii Zumaya, Flores Olv. & Borsch
Iresine schaffneri S.Watson
Iresine sousae Zumaya, Borsch & Flores Olv.
Iresine stricta Standl.
Iresine valdesii Zumaya, Flores Olv. & Borsch

Formerly placed here 
Aerva javanica (Burm.f.) Juss. ex Schult. (as I. javanica Burm.f. or I. persica Burm.f.)
Hebanthe grandiflora (Hook.) Borsch & Pedersen (as I. grandiflora Hook.)
Pedersenia macrophylla (R.E.Fr.) Holub (as I. macrophylla R.E.Fr.)
Pedersenia argentata (Mart.) Holub (as I. argentata (Mart.) D.Dietr. or I. elatior Sieber ex Moq.)
Pfaffia glomerata (A.Spreng.) Pedersen (as I. glomerata A.Spreng.)

References

Citations

Sources 
 General references

External links 

 

 
Ayahuasca
Amaranthaceae genera